Dehkuyeh (also Romanized as Dehkūyeh, Deh Kūyeh, and Deh Kooyeh; also known as Dehkūh) is a village in Dehkuyeh Rural District, in the Central District of Larestan County, Fars Province, Iran. At the 2006 census, its population was 3,560, in 803 families.

References 

Populated places in Larestan County